Solo is a 1977 New Zealand romantic comedy directed by Tony Williams. The plot concerns a hitchhiker who falls for a pilot.

Cast
 Vincent Gil as Paul Robinson 
 Lisa Peers as Judy Ballantyne 
 Martyn Sanderson as Jules Catweazle 
 Davina Whitehouse as Rohana Beaulieu 
 Maxwell Fernie as Crispin Beaulieu 
 Perry Armstrong as Billy Robinson 
 Frances Edmond as School teacher 
 Uncle Roy as Man on bike 
 Jock Spence as Radio operator 
 Gillian Hope as Woman on train
 Veronica Lawrence as Sue 
 Val Murphy as Anita

References

External links

Solo at Oz Movies
Solo (1977) at New Zealand Feature Film Database

1977 films
New Zealand romantic comedy films
1970s English-language films